Tobermorite is a calcium silicate hydrate mineral with chemical formula: 
Ca5Si6O16(OH)2·4H2O or 
Ca5Si6(O,OH)18·5H2O.

Two structural varieties are distinguished: tobermorite-11 Å and tobermorite-14 Å. 
Tobermorite occurs in hydrated cement paste and can be found in nature as an alteration mineral in metamorphosed limestone and in skarn. It has been reported to occur in the Maqarin Area of north Jordan and in the Crestmore Quarry near Crestmore Heights, Riverside County, California.

Tobermorite was first described in 1880 for an occurrence in Scotland, on the Isle of Mull, around the locality of Tobermory.

Use in Roman concrete
Aluminum-substituted tobermorite is understood to be a key ingredient responsible for the longevity of ancient undersea Roman concrete. The volcanic ash that Romans used for construction of sea walls contained phillipsite, and an interaction with sea water actually caused the crystalline structures in the concrete to expand and strengthen, making that material substantially more durable than modern concrete when exposed to sea water.

Cement chemistry

Tobermorite is often used in thermodynamical calculations to represent the pole of the most evolved calcium silicate hydrate (C-S-H). According to its chemical formula, its atomic Ca/Si or molar CaO/SiO2 (C/S) ratio is 5/6 (0.83). Jennite represents the less evolved pole with a C/S ratio of 1.50 (9/6).

See also
 Other calcium silicate hydrate (C-S-H) minerals: 
 
 
 
 
 
 Other calcium aluminium silicate hydrate, (C-A-S-H) minerals:
 Hydrogarnet
 Hydrogrossular
 Hydrotalcite
 Katoite
 Tacharanite

References

Further reading

 American Mineralogist (1954) 39, 1038.

External links
 Tobermorite in the American Mineralogist Crystal Structure Database

Calcium compounds
Calcium minerals
Cement
Crestmore Heights, California
Geology of Riverside County, California
Hydrates
Inorganic compounds
Inosilicates
Minerals in space group 20
Orthorhombic minerals